Regional Governments, in the Government of Peru, is a government organization which organizes, conducts, and manages, each one of the twenty-five regions of Peru. It has political, economic, and administrative autonomy in the subjects of its matter. The Constitution of Peru first mandated the establishment of regional governments in 1979.

Structure
Regional Governments of Peru are composed of two sections.

Regional Council
The Regional Council is the regulatory and oversight body of the regional governments, with a minimum of 7 and a maximum of 25 members.

Regional Presidency
The Regional Presidency is the executive organ of the Regional Government. The president is elected by direct suffrage in conjunction with a Regional Vice-President for a period of four years. In addition, it is made up of Regional Management which is coordinated and directed by a General Manager.

Election
The election of the members of the Regional Council, including the President and Vice-President, is held by direct suffrage for a period of four years. Their offices are unresignable but are revocable.

See also
Administrative divisions of Peru
Former regions of Peru
Government of Peru

References 

Government of Peru
Subdivisions of Peru